Law enforcement in Indonesia is mainly performed by the Indonesian National Police (POLRI), together with other law enforcement agencies which are under the president, a certain ministry or State-owned company (BUMN) which perform policing duties for a certain public service, these law enforcement agencies are under supervision and are trained by the Indonesian National Police. The Indonesian National Police is basically the national civilian police force of the country responsible for enforcing law and order of the state.

Police forces

Indonesian National Police

The Indonesian National Police (POLRI) is the main agency responsible for maintaining security and public order, law enforcement, and provide protection and service to the community in Indonesia. The force is a centralised organisation with responsibilities ranging from traffic control, criminal investigation, intelligence gathering and counter-terrorism duties. The Indonesian National Police is the national policing force of Indonesia with its headquarters located in Jakarta. It is under the auspices of the President of Indonesia.
The highest command of the national police in Indonesia is executed in Jakarta, at the Indonesian National Police Headquarters (Mabes Polri) located at Trunojoyo Street, Kebayoran Baru, South Jakarta. The National Police HQ oversees every provincial police of the country, each Province of Indonesia has its own Police Headquarters known as "POLDA" an abbreviation of Kepolisian Daerah (Regional Police) in Indonesian, it oversees several city or regional police departments which are responsible for a city or regency (Kabupaten) in the province, it is known as "POLRES" (Kepolisian Resort), a "Polres" then oversees several police stations responsible for a sub-district (kecamatan) known as "POLSEK" (Kepolisian Sektor).

Special units of the Indonesian National Police
Detachment 88 (Densus 88) 

The Detachment 88 or known locally as "Densus 88" is the special counter-terrorism unit of the Indonesian National Police.
Mobile Brigade Corps (Brimob) 

The Mobile Brigade Corps or known locally as "Brimob" is the paramilitary force of the Indonesian National Police tasked to conduct high-risk law enforcement such as counterinsurgency, riot control, and hostage rescue. It is the PTU and SWAT unit of Polri. Their uniform is the same like other police units, but wear a dark blue beret as their headgear, during urban-operational duties, they wear black uniforms and during jungle-operational duties, they wear green. Each provincial police headquarters (Polda) in Indonesia has a Brimob unit.

Maritime law enforcement agencies

Maritime Security Agency

The Maritime Security Agency is a maritime patrol of the Republic of Indonesia. Bakamla is a non-ministerial government institution which reports directly to the President through the Coordinating Ministry for Political, Legal, and Security Affairs. Bakamla's duty is to conduct security and safety patrols in the territorial waters of Indonesia and the jurisdiction of Indonesia.

Sea and Coast Guard

The Sea and Coast Guard is an agency of the Government of Indonesia which has the main function to ensure the safety of shipping activity inside the Indonesian Maritime Zone. The "KPLP" has the task to formulate and execute policies, standards, norms, guidelines, criteria and procedures, as well as technical guidance, evaluation and reporting concerning maritime patrol and security, which is conducted in coordination with other maritime law enforcement agencies of the country such as BAKAMLA, Indonesian National Police Water Unit, and also in certain cases with the Indonesian Navy. KPLP is under the auspices of the Directorate General of Sea Transportation of the Indonesian Ministry of Transportation.

National Police Water Unit

The Indonesian National Police has a water unit ( abbreviated "Polair") responsible to conduct law enforcement and enforce security and order of the coast and state waters.

Marine and Fisheries Resources Surveillance

The Marine and Fisheries Resources Surveillance  is a government agency under the management of the Ministry of Marine Affairs and Fisheries of Indonesia. Formally established on 23 November 2000 according to Presidential Decree No. 165/2000, the PSDKP is the agency responsible for supervising the marine and fishery resources of the Republic of Indonesia.

Criticism
There has been many criticism by political observers in Indonesia concerning the presence of multiple maritime law enforcement agencies in Indonesia which tend to overlap authority between one another in the maritime zone of the country. As of 2015, maritime law enforcement in Indonesia is conducted by 12 different agencies from different ministries of the government. The Navy is also authorized to conduct maritime law enforcement in certain cases as it is stated in the constitution of the country.
There has been plans to amalgamate these different maritime law enforcement agencies to become a singular national "Indonesian Coast Guard" such as the Coast Guard of the United States of America and Coast Guard of India since 2011. In February 2020, President Joko Widodo announced that he intended to have Maritime Security Agency as Indonesian coast guard. 
However, as of 2021, new maritime security law to fix overlapping authority in maritime law enforcement is still being drafted. On March 2022, the government issue regulation on Governance of Maritime Security, Safety and Law Enforcement at Indonesia’s Territorial Water and Jurisdiction and designate Maritime Security Agency as coordinating body for all maritime law enforcement agencies.

Other law enforcement agencies

Other types of government agencies which is involved in law enforcement of the state:
 Public Prosecution Service
 Corruption Eradication Commission (KPK)
 National Narcotics Board (BNN), specialized agency for prevention and investigation of illicit drugs abuse.
 National Agency for Combating Terrorism (BNPT)
 Directorate General of Customs and Excise
 Tax Office, enforce law in taxation.
 Directorate General of Immigration, enforce law concerning immigration.
 Financial Services Authority
 Nuclear Regulatory Agency, enforce law in nuclear energy.
 National Agency of Drug and Food Control, oversee foods, drugs, and cosmetics in Indonesia.
 Directorate General of Post and Informatics Devices Resource of the Ministry of Communication and Informatics, enforce law in information technology and radiowaves.
 Ministry of Energy and Mineral Resources
 Ministry of Industry
 Ministry of Trade
 Ministry of Health
 Ministry of Transportation, oversee and enforce law in the realm of transportation (land, sea and air). The Traffic Wardens (Dishub) in Indonesia are under the command of the Ministry of Transportation which are responsible to conduct law enforcement towards yellow-plate vehicles (public transportation vehicles and other over-sized vehicles) and also take action towards parking violators. They also assist the Traffic police in directing traffic. They wear light-blue for their shirt and dark blue for their pants as their uniform.
 Personal Data Protection Authority Institute, enforce law in personal data protection.

See also
 Crime in Indonesia
 Laws of Indonesia
 Traffic Warden in Indonesia
 Babinsa

References